Ada Limón (born March 28, 1976) is an American poet. On 12 July 2022, she was named the 24th Poet Laureate of the United States by the Librarian of Congress. This made her the first Latina to be Poet Laureate of the United States.

Early years and education 

Limón, who is of Mexican-American descent, grew up in Sonoma, California. She attended the drama school at the University of Washington, where she studied theatre. After taking writing courses from professors including Colleen J. McElroy, she went on to receive her MFA from New York University in 2001, where she studied with Sharon Olds, Philip Levine, Marie Howe, Mark Doty, Agha Shahid Ali, and Tom Sleigh.

Upon graduation, Limón received a fellowship to live and write at the Fine Arts Work Center in Provincetown, Massachusetts. In 2003, she received a grant from the New York Foundation for the Arts, and in the same year won the Chicago Literary Award for Poetry.

Career

After 12 years in New York City, where she worked for various magazines such as Martha Stewart Living, GQ, and Travel + Leisure, Limón now lives in both Lexington, Kentucky and Sonoma, California, where she writes and teaches.

Limón's first book, Lucky Wreck, was chosen by Jean Valentine as the winner of the Autumn House Poetry Prize in 2005, while her second book, This Big Fake World, was the winner of the Pearl Poetry Prize in 2006. The two books came out within less than a year of each other. In a 2014 article in Compose magazine, she stated: "I went from having no books at all, to having two in the span of a year. I felt like I had won the lottery, well, without the money. I suppose, in my life, I’ve never done things the ordinary way. I’m either deep in the bottom of the well or nowhere near water." She serves on the faculty of Queens University of Charlotte low-residency M.F.A. program, and the "24 Pearl Street" online program for the Provincetown Fine Arts Work Center.

When her third book, Sharks in the Rivers (Milkweed Editions, 2010) was released, a reviewer writing in The Brooklyn Rail observed: "Unlike much contemporary poetry, Limón’s work isn’t text-derivative or deconstructivist. She personalizes her homilies, stamping them with the authenticity of invention and self-discovery." Limón's fourth book, Bright Dead Things, was released in 2015. She was shortlisted as a finalist for the 2015 National Book Award for Poetry. Her 2018 book, The Carrying, subsequently won a National Book Critics Circle Award. 

Her poem "State Bird" appeared in the June 2, 2014 issue of The New Yorker, and her poem "How to Triumph Like a Girl" (2013), which portrays different aspects of female horses, was awarded the 2015 Pushcart Prize. Her work has also appeared in the Harvard Review and the Pleiades.

She has been a beneficiary of the Kentucky Foundation for Women.

Awards and honors
In 2013, Limón served as a judge for the National Book Award for Poetry.

In July 2022, Librarian of Congress Carla Hayden appointed her the 24th United States Poet Laureate for the term of 2022-2023.

Bibliography

Poetry
Collections
 
 This Big Fake World, Pearl Editions, 2006 
 Sharks in the rivers, Milkweed Editions, 2010 
 Bright Dead Things, Milkweed Editions, 2015 
 The Carrying, Milkweed Editions, 2018 
 The Hurting Kind, Milkweed Editions, 2022 
 Shelter: A Love Letter To Trees, Scribd Originals, 2022 

Chapbooks
 99¢ Heart, Big Game Books, 2007
 What Sucks Us In Will Surely Swallow Us Whole, Cinematheque Press, 2009

List of poems

References

External links

 Official Site
 Official Blog
 "Crush", poem by Ada Limón, The New Yorker
 "Overjoyed", poem by Ada Limón, Harvard Review
 Two Poems by Ada Limón, "Marketing Life For Those Of Us Left" and "A Name"
 Two Poems by Ada Limón, "61 Trees" and "rest Stop"
 An Interview with Poet Ada Limón

Living people
1976 births
American women poets
The New Yorker people
21st-century American poets
American poets of Mexican descent
21st-century American women writers
University of Washington alumni
People from Sonoma County, California
People from Lexington, Kentucky